Nelson Chanady (born November 19, 1963 in Miami, Florida, U.S.) is a former American "Old School" professional Bicycle Motocross (BMX) racer whose prime competitive years were from 1981 to 1987

Racing career milestones

Note: Professional first are on the national level unless otherwise indicated.

*In the NBL it is B"/Superclass/"A" pro (beginning with 2000 season); in the ABA it is "A" pro.
**In the NBL it is "A" pro (Elite men); in the ABA it is "AA" pro.

Career factory and major bike shop sponsors

Note: This listing only denotes the racer's primary sponsors. At any given time a racer could have numerous ever-changing co-sponsors. Primary sponsorships can be verified by BMX press coverage and sponsor's advertisements at the time in question. When possible exact dates are given.

Amateur
 Team Honda: Mid 1980 to Late 1980
The Hot Shop (Bicycle Shop) (exclusively): Late 1980–September 1982.
GT (Gary Turner) Racing/The Hot Shop: September 1982–June 1983.  GT Racing at this time was his primary sponsor with first and longtime sponsor The Hot Shop becoming is secondary sponsor. This unusual arrangement was reflected by his uniform swapping. In ABA and NBL races in the Western States of the United States he raced in his GT livery; at ABA and NBL races in Eastern states he raced in his Hot Shop uniform with them as his primary sponsor. As a side note his GT uniform jersey had "The Hot Shop" written in large block capital letters vertically down its sleeves, as opposed to having "GT BMX" and a racing stripe down them. His Hot Shop uniform just had a GT patch. In June 1983 The Hot Shop Bicycle shop disbanded its race team. From then on Nelson Chanady was sponsored exclusively by GT Racing. Nelson Chanady's then unique dual sponsorship situation between GT and The Hot Shop was actually a foreshadowing of dual or even triple "primary sponsorships that would start in the late 1980s after BMX racing's first recession and would become common place by the late 1990s and early 2000s as companies both within and outside the BMX industry sought to spread the cost of sponsoring a race team between them.
GT Racing (exclusively): June 1983-Early December 1984, Late February 1985- Chanady would turn pro with this sponsor.

Professional
GT Racing (exclusively): June 1983-Early December 1984, Late February 1985-  In December 1984 GT dropped Chanady from their team for lack of performance. In the BMX periodical BMX Plus! it was customary for them to along with the racer's name in the results to list his primary sponsor with him. For instance "Eric Rupe/Mongoose". The listings for "Nelson Chanady/GT" ends beginning with the NBL National #3 in Montgomery, Alabama in the April 1985 issue. Also in that issue was the note that GT notified Chanady that they were going to let his contract expire and not renew it. Despite this, Nelson Chanady paid his own way to that race, wore a GT uniform and sat with the team. Apparently this show of loyalty impressed GT enough to reconsider their decision and rehired him (or never dropped him formally) in early 1985 since Nelson is listed in the race results with "GT" after his name beginning again with NBL National #8 in Montclair, California in the July 1985 issue on page 52. This was confirmed in the August 1985 issue's "Check point" mini coverage of the NBL Florida Nationals #11 and #12. Another stated and perhaps more important reason was that GT wanted Chanady to represent them at the 1985 Kellogg Championship series in England.

Career bicycle motocross titles

Note: Listed are District, State/Provincial/Department, Regional, National, and International titles in italics. "Defunct" refers to the fact of that sanctioning body in question no longer existing at the start of the racer's career or at that stage of his/her career. Depending on point totals of individual racers, winners of Grand Nationals do not necessarily win National titles. Series and one off Championships are also listed in block.

Amateur
National Bicycle Association (NBA)
None
National Bicycle League (NBL)
1981 Florida state No.1
1981 16 Expert National No.2
1982, 1983 17 & Over Expert National No.1

American Bicycle Association (ABA)

1982 17 & Over Expert Jag World Champion (ABA sanctioned)
National Pedal Sport Association (NPSA)
1980 16 Junior National No.1
International Bicycle Motocross Federation (IBMXF)
1982 17 Expert Murray World Cup of BMX I Champion.
1982 17 Expert & Overall World Champion.

Nelson Chanady became the first Overall World Champion for the IBMXF in 1982, its first World Championship event (the International Championship event held in October 1981 at the Pontiac Silverdome in Pontiac, Michigan is generally isn't counted). However, there was some controversy with this title. The IBMXF followed the previous practice of holding a Trophy Dash race off between the fourteen-year-old and above classes (Expert, Open and Girls divisions but not Cruiser) including the professional winners and amateur winners racing against each other to decide the Overall Championship. This precedent was set by the Jag World Championships during the first three years of the four previous times the event was held beginning in December 1978 (which the NBL had co-sanctioned with the NBA the first three years), the Pro World Champion Greg Hill refused to race Chanady, the 17 Expert Champion and the other amateur champions for the overall title. His feelings this time where why should a pro race the amateurs? What is there to prove? At first the 14 & Over Open winner Andy Patterson tried to instigate a spontaneous boycott with the other racers, refusing to start unless Greg Hill joined them on the starting line. However, NBL Competition Director Robert Tedesco relayed to the other racers that Greg Hill's mind was set and he would not race. Tedesco urged the racers to participate without Hill. Accepting Hill's resolution, they agreed. With this Nelson became the first and last Overall World Champion. From then on the Pro World Champion is presumed to be the overall World Champion given the assumption that the Pro class is the most difficult and competitive class in BMX, as it is with any other sport. If you win the Pro Class you are assumed to be the Overall Champion.

Professional

National Bicycle Association (NBA)
None
National Bicycle League (NBL)
None
American Bicycle Association (ABA)
None
United States Bicycle Motocross Association (USBA)
None
International Bicycle Motocross Federation (IBMXF)
1985 Challenge Cup Pro Champion
Pro Series Championships and Invitationals

1984 Kellog's Frosties BMX Champion.

The Kellogg's Frosties BMX Championship held in Birmingham, England was a series of six races held on three days total (but stretched out over a week including off days) that was centered around the invited eight top pros of the United States and eight British pros and tailored for British television broadcast. There were also eight amateurs class races held but the race focus was meant for the pros. In a bit of serendipity on Chanady's part, Stu Thomsen was slated to be one of the pros to race, but due to an ankle injury suffered at a national in Memphis, Tennessee, as per prior agreement with race organizers in the event of a slot becoming available, GT had the right to choose the replacement. GT chose Nelson Chanady over fellow GT pro Rober Fehd and he became an alternate.

Notable accolades
Named one of the "Terrible Ten", BMX Actions pick of fastest amateur racers in the world in 1983
Named one of "1984's Hottest Rookie Pros" by BMX Action Magazine.

Significant injuries

Racing habits and traits

Miscellaneous

Post BMX career

BMX press magazine interviews and articles
"Total Racer: Nelson Chanady Total BMX September 1981 Vol.2 No.4 pg.24
"Nelson Who?" BMX Plus! October 1981 Vol.4 No.10 pg.32 side bar article on his meteoric rise.
"Nelson Chanady" Total BMX November 1982 Vol.3 No.5 pg.46
"Sharpshootin': Nelson Chanady" BMX Action December 1982 Vo.7 No.12 pg.90 short biography.
"1984's Hottest Rookie Pros" BMX Action October 1984 Vol.9 No.10 pg.74

BMX magazine coversNote: Only magazines that were in publication at the time of the racer's career(s) are listed unless specifically noted.Minicycle/BMX Action & Super BMX:
None
Bicycle Motocross Action & Go:
None
BMX Plus!:
December 1983 Vol.6 No.11* In inset with Stu Thomsen, Greg Hill, Tim Judge, Gary Debacker and others at beginning of national banner presentation at the start of a race. Brian Patterson is the main image.

*Due to a change in ownership, BMX Plus! did not publish a May 1983 issue.

Total BMX:
November 1982 Vol.3 No.5
Bicycles and Dirt:
None
NBA World & NBmxA World (The official NBA/NBmxA membership publication):
None
Bicycles Today & BMX Today (The official NBL membership publication under two names):

ABA Action, American BMXer, BMXer (The official ABA membership publication under three names):

USBA Racer (The official USBA membership publication):

Notes

External links
 The American Bicycle Association (ABA) Website.
 The National Bicycle League (NBL) Website.
 GT Bicycles USA.

American male cyclists
BMX riders
1963 births
Living people